Wasiu Alabi Odetola  (Pasuma) (born 27 November 1967), also known as "Oganla", "Gauzu Fuji", "Ijoba Fuji" is a Fuji musician, Nigerian film actor.

Early life 

He was born on the 27th of November 1967. Spent his childhood and a small part of his adulthood in Mushin, Lagos State.

He was single handedly raised by his mother, Alhaja Adijat Kubura Odetola popularly known as Iyawo Anobi to whom he often praises in his records for being his biggest support system.

He attended the Muslim mission primary school in 1973, before moving to Nigerian Model High school, where he completed his secondary school education.

He started off his music career when he was still in secondary school. While others would be participating in sport activities, pasuma and some of his friends would be in their own corner, singing.

He started writing his own songs in 1984. The young Pasuma, whose role model was K1 De Ultimate, released his first album titled TALAZO 84 in 1984. The album, which received huge credits from fans, pushed Pasuma into wanting to do more. He released his official first music album in 1993.

Career 
Pasuma's album "Recognition" was released in 1993. He has since then released over 30 albums, going on to become one of the most successful Fuji musicians in Nigeria.

He has also collaborated with several recording artists, some of which are Bola Abimbola and King Sunny Ade. Asides from singing, he has also featured in a number of Nigerian movies such as Iyanje and Alenibare.
 
On 6 Sept 2015, Pasuma beat the likes of Olamide, Phyno, and Flavour to emerge the winner of Best Indigenous Artist of the year at the Nigeria Entertainment Awards.

In 2020, He released “MMM” Money Making Machine. This album was released during Covid-19, he expressed that he released the album just to keep his fans entertained since parties or large gatherings of any kind was prohibited due to the virus. 
MMM went on to become of his greatest works, as it increased his already existing popularity particularly among those who viewed the Fuji genre as music of the old.

He won the Best International Music Video 2021 by Hollywood and African Prestigious Awards (HAPAwards).

In 2022, he released critically acclaimed Afro fuji single featuring Qdot, titled Omo Ologo. He went on to release two Fuji albums titled; Legendary and December tonic titled Human nature.

Videography

References 

1967 births
Living people
Nigerian Muslims
Nigerian male film actors
People from Kwara State
Musicians from Lagos
Male actors from Lagos
20th-century Nigerian musicians
21st-century Nigerian musicians
Yoruba musicians
Yoruba male actors
Male actors in Yoruba cinema
Yoruba-language singers
20th-century births